Nic Cramer (born December 28, 1965) is a Swedish pornographic film director. He has directed over 120 adult movies since 1992. Cramer stated in 2012 that he intended to return to Los Angeles and the adult industry, after a six-year hiatus in his native Sweden.

Awards
 1998 AVN Award – Best Director, Film (Operation Sex Siege)
 1999 AVN Award – Best Director, Film (Looker)
 1999 AVN Award – Best Editing, Film (Looker)
 1999 AVN Award – Best Screenplay, Film (Looker)

References

External links
 
 
 
 

1965 births
Swedish pornographic film directors
Living people